Sarver is an unincorporated community in Buffalo Township, Butler County, Pennsylvania. It is located in the south-eastern part of the county. Sarver is generally known as most of the area near and west/southwest of State Route 356 (Butler Road/South Pike Road/North Pike Road) in the township. Until around the late 1990s- early 2000s, Sarver was home to only a few residents. Its economy was very small and was based solely on a grocery store, a few small restaurants, along with a few gas stations and car dealerships. It has since grown to hold many new medium to high income housing plans, with the addition of many new shopping centers and businesses. The ZIP code is 16055. Many of Sarver's school-age residents attend the Freeport Area School District.

Notable people
Michele McDonald, model and pageant winner

References

External links
History of Sarver and Buffalo Township

Pittsburgh metropolitan area
Unincorporated communities in Butler County, Pennsylvania
Unincorporated communities in Pennsylvania